Professor Geoffrey (Geoff) Raisman FRS (28 June 1939 – 27 January 2017) was a British neuroscientist.

Personal life
He was born in Leeds and died in London. His parents were Harry and Celia Raisman, both also born in Leeds. Geoffrey's grandparents were Jewish immigrants from Lithuania. He describes his family's story in his book, The Undark Sky. Raisman was not religious. He attended Roundhay School and Pembroke College, Oxford.

Career
He was chair of neural regeneration at University College London's Institute of Neurology. In 2014, his team claimed to have regrown nerve cells where they had been severed, restoring the damaged spinal cord of the Polish paraplegic Darek Fidyka.

External links
http://www.nichollsfoundationhullander.org/professor-geoffrey-raisman/ 
http://www.newyorker.com/magazine/2016/01/25/one-small-step-annals-of-medicine-d-t-max

References

1939 births
2017 deaths
British neuroscientists
English people of Lithuanian-Jewish descent
Scientists from Yorkshire
People educated at Roundhay School
Alumni of Pembroke College, Oxford
Fellows of the Royal Society